This page provides supplementary chemical data on bromine pentafluoride.

Material Safety Data Sheet 
The handling of this chemical may incur notable safety precautions. It is highly recommended that you seek the Material Safety Datasheet (MSDS) for this chemical from a reliable source  such as Matheson Trigas, and follow its directions.

Structure and properties

Thermodynamic properties

Spectral data

References

Chemical data pages
Chemical data pages cleanup